Shuangqiao District is a former district of Chongqing, China.

In October 2011, Shuangqiao was merged into Dazu County to form the new Dazu District.

References

Districts of Chongqing